The SJPF Segunda Liga Player of the Month (often called Second League Player of the Month) is an association football award that recognizes the best Segunda Liga player each month of the season and is conceived by the SJPF (syndicate of professional football players). The award has been presented since the 2010–11 season and the recipient is based on individual scores assigned by the three national sports dailies, A Bola, Record, and O Jogo. Miguel Rosa has won the award most on different eight occasions.

Prior to the start 2012–13 Segunda Liga season, the SJPF announced that the SJPF Segunda Liga Player of the Month award would be awarded to a player on a bimonthly status with one player receiving an award for two months of football that have been played. The awards would be awarded during the following periods:

 August and September (Awarded to the Player of the Month in relation to football being played between Gameweek 1 to Gameweek 8) 
 October and November (Awarded to the Player of the Month in relation to football being played between Gameweek 9 to Gameweek 15)
 December (Awarded to the Player of the Month in relation to football being played between Gameweek 16 to Gameweek 20)
 January (Awarded to the Player of the Month in relation to football being played between Gameweek 21 to Gameweek 25)
 February (Awarded to the Player of the Month in relation to football being played between Gameweek 26 to Gameweek 29)
 March (Awarded to the Player of the Month in relation to football being played between Gameweek 30 to Gameweek 33)
 April (Awarded to the Player of the Month in relation to football being played between Gameweek 34 to Gameweek 38)

Winners

Key

Statistics

Awards won by club

Awards won by nationality

Multiple winners

Awards won by position

See also
 SJPF Player of the Month
 SJPF Young Player of the Month

References

External links
  The official website at SJPF
 List of winners at ZeroZero

 
Portuguese football trophies and awards
Association football player non-biographical articles